Indian Communist Party (ICP) was a political party in India, a splinter group of Communist Party of India (CPI). The leader of ICP was Mohit Sen.

Sen parted ways with the CPI, following its anti-Congress stand, in 1978, following Indira Gandhi's emergency and subsequent failure in the election.

In 1985, Mohit Sen along with Com. Ramesh Sinha (both senior CPI leaders then) joined the Indian Communist Party then led by M. Kalyanasundaram, D. Pandian and SU. Palanisamy.

In 1988, Indian Communist Party merged with the All India Communist Party to become United Communist Party of India. Sen became its general secretary, a post he held for 15 years until his death.

References

Defunct communist parties in India
Communist Party of India breakaway groups
Political parties with year of establishment missing
Political parties disestablished in 1988
1988 disestablishments in India